Dietmar Schwarz (born 29 January 1960) is a German boxer. He competed in the men's light welterweight event at the 1980 Summer Olympics.

References

External links
 

1960 births
Living people
German male boxers
Olympic boxers of East Germany
Boxers at the 1980 Summer Olympics
People from Nordwestmecklenburg
Light-welterweight boxers